Peter Berling (20 March 1934 – 21 November 2017) was a German actor, film producer and writer. He has worked on several occasions with director Werner Herzog, among them his collaborations with actor Klaus Kinski like Aguirre, the Wrath of God, Fitzcarraldo and Cobra Verde.

In several of his medieval novels, Berling has drawn on conspiracy theories based on the Priory of Sion.

Berling died on 21 November 2017 in Rome, aged 83.

Films

  (1957) - (uncredited)
  (1966)
 Detectives (1969) - Möbelpacker (uncredited)
 Love Is Colder Than Death (1969) - Illegaler Waffenhändler
 Uxmal (1969) - World Manager
  (1970) - (uncredited)
 Red Sun (1970) - Mercedesfahrer
  (1970) - Executioner
  (1971) - Hansel
 Whity (1971) - The Hefty Bartender (uncredited)
 Furchtlose Flieger (1971) - Berlinger
 Beware of a Holy Whore (1971)
  (1971) - Mike
  (1971) - Sergeant Bogdanowitsch
 Terror Desire (1971)
 When Women Were Called Virgins (1972) - Romildo Varrone
 Return of Halleluja (1972) - Lt. Schultz
 The Italian Connection (1972) - Damiano
 Aguirre, the Wrath of God (1972) - Don Fernando de Guzman
 Dirty Weekend (1973) - German tourist
 Revolver (1973) - Grappa
 The Three Musketeers of the West (1973) - Hans
 Es knallt – und die Engel singen (1974) - China-Joe
 Julia (1974) - Uncle Alex
 The Loves and Times of Scaramouche (1976) - (uncredited)
 Victory March (1976)
 Black and White in Color (1976) - Père Jean de la Croix
 Meet Him and Die (1976) - Bavoso
 Mister Scarface (1976) - Valentino
 Young, Violent, Dangerous (1976) - Oberwald
 Maladolescenza (1977, writer)
  (1978) - Maler
 The Marriage of Maria Braun (1978) - Bronski (as Berling)
 Red Rings of Fear (1978) - Bit Part
  (1980) - Doppel-Dieter
 Veronika Voss (1982) - Filmproduzent / Dicker Mann
 Fitzcarraldo (1982) - Opera Manager
 An Ideal Adventure (1982) - Brian De Pino
 Petomaniac (1983) - Ziedler
 Dagger Eyes (1983) - Reinhardt
 The Two Lives of Mattia Pascal (1985) - Aristide Melainassis
 Tex and the Lord of the Deep (1985) - El Morisco
  (1986) - Mr. Urdos
 The Name of the Rose (1986) - Jean d'Anneaux
 Cobra Verde (1987) - Bernabé
 The Last Temptation of Christ (1988) - Beggar
 Haunted Summer (1988) - Maurice
 Francesco (1989) - Bishop Guido
  (1989) - Petronius
 The Voyager (1991) - Baptist
  (1993) - Hank Snyder
 Sátántangó (1994) - Orvos
 Tykho Moon (1996)
  (1997) - Peterchen
 Semana santa (2002) - Castenada
 Gangs of New York (2002) - Knife Act Caller
  (2015) - Hein

Novels

References

External links

  (German)
 

1934 births
2017 deaths
People from Międzyrzecz
People from Posen-West Prussia
20th-century German novelists
21st-century German novelists
German male film actors
20th-century German male actors
21st-century German male actors
German film producers
German biographers
Male biographers
German male novelists
20th-century German male writers
21st-century German male writers
German male non-fiction writers